The 1986 International Formula 3000 Championship was contested over an eleven-round series. A total of 28 different teams, 71 different drivers, 7 different chassis and 2 different engines competed.

Drivers and teams

Calendar

Note:

Race 1 stopped and restarted and stopped again earlier due to an accident involving Dominique Delestre and Thierry Tassin. Only half-points were awarded.

Race 9 stopped earlier due to an accident involving Andrew Gilbert-Scott and Alain Ferté in heavy rain. Only half-points were awarded.

Race 11 stopped and restarted.  Pierluigi Martini was disqualified from victory as his mechanics had worked on his car between starts. He was later reinstated as the winner.

Championship standings
Scoring system

Points are awarded to the top 6 classified finishers.

Final point standings

Notes
Results in bold indicate pole position.
Results in italics indicate fastest lap.

References

International Formula 3000
International Formula 3000 seasons